The 5th constituency of the Ain is a French legislative constituency in the Ain département. It was created by ordinance n°2009-935 of 29 July 2009, ratified by the French Parliament on 21 January 2010. It consists of the cantons of Ambérieu-en-Bugey, Brénod, Champagne-in-Valromey, Hauteville-Lompnes, Izernore, Lhuis, Nantua, North Oyonnax, Oyonnax South, Poncin, Saint-Rambert-en-Bugey, Virieu-le-Grand. The constituency was first contested in the 2012 legislative elections.

Members elected

Election results

2022

 
 
 
|-
| colspan="8" bgcolor="#E9E9E9"|
|-
 

 
 
 
 
 * Incumbent Damien Abad stood for LR at the last election, but is standing as an independent having joined the Borne government as Minister of Solidarity in May 2022. While not an official part of the Ensemble Citoyens coalition, his candidacy is supported by the coalition and they have not stood a candidate in the constituency.

2017

2012

|- style="background-color:#E9E9E9;text-align:center;"
! colspan="2" rowspan="2" style="text-align:left;" | Candidate
! rowspan="2" colspan="2" style="text-align:left;" | Party
! colspan="2" | 1st round
! colspan="2" | 2nd round
|- style="background-color:#E9E9E9;text-align:center;"
! width="75" | Votes
! width="30" | %
! width="75" | Votes
! width="30" | %
|-
| style="background-color:" |
| style="text-align:left;" | Damien Abad
| style="text-align:left;" | Union for a Popular Movement
| UMP
| 
| 31.81%
| 
| 56.40%
|-
| style="background-color:" |
| style="text-align:left;" | Josiane Exposito
| style="text-align:left;" | Socialist Party
| PS
| 
| 28.51%
| 
| 43.60%
|-
| style="background-color:" |
| style="text-align:left;" | Patrick Sokolowski
| style="text-align:left;" | National Front
| FN
| 
| 17.99%
| colspan="2" style="text-align:left;" |
|-
| style="background-color:" |
| style="text-align:left;" | Michel Perraud
| style="text-align:left;" | Radical Party
| PRV
| 
| 9.49%
| colspan="2" style="text-align:left;" |
|-
| style="background-color:" |
| style="text-align:left;" | Mylène Ferri
| style="text-align:left;" | Left Front
| FG
| 
| 7.32%
| colspan="2" style="text-align:left;" |
|-
| style="background-color:" |
| style="text-align:left;" | Jean Galienne
| style="text-align:left;" | Ecologist
| ECO
| 
| 1.07%
| colspan="2" style="text-align:left;" |
|-
| style="background-color:" |
| style="text-align:left;" | Brigitte Sansano
| style="text-align:left;" | Miscellaneous Right
| DVD
| 
| 0.73%
| colspan="2" style="text-align:left;" |
|-
| style="background-color:" |
| style="text-align:left;" | Patrick Royer
| style="text-align:left;" | Ecologist
| ECO
| 
| 0.72%
| colspan="2" style="text-align:left;" |
|-
| style="background-color:" |
| style="text-align:left;" | Bernard Favre
| style="text-align:left;" | Ecologist
| ECO
| 
| 0.56%
| colspan="2" style="text-align:left;" |
|-
| style="background-color:" |
| style="text-align:left;" | Jean-Michel Boulme
| style="text-align:left;" | Far Left
| EXG
| 
| 0.53%
| colspan="2" style="text-align:left;" |
|-
| style="background-color:" |
| style="text-align:left;" | Christophe Ceresero-Lanes
| style="text-align:left;" | Far Left
| EXG
| 
| 0.44%
| colspan="2" style="text-align:left;" |
|-
| style="background-color:" |
| style="text-align:left;" | Bernard Leger
| style="text-align:left;" | Miscellaneous Right
| DVD
| 
| 0.42%
| colspan="2" style="text-align:left;" |
|-
| style="background-color:" |
| style="text-align:left;" | Guy Largeron
| style="text-align:left;" | Far Left
| EXG
| 
| 0.40%
| colspan="2" style="text-align:left;" |
|-
| colspan="8" style="background-color:#E9E9E9;"|
|- style="font-weight:bold"
| colspan="4" style="text-align:left;" | Total
| 
| 100%
| 
| 100%
|-
| colspan="8" style="background-color:#E9E9E9;"|
|-
| colspan="4" style="text-align:left;" | Registered voters
| 
| style="background-color:#E9E9E9;"|
| 
| style="background-color:#E9E9E9;"|
|-
| colspan="4" style="text-align:left;" | Blank/Void ballots
| 
| 1.32%
| 
| 3.23%
|-
| colspan="4" style="text-align:left;" | Turnout
| 
| 57.18%
| 
| 54.70%
|-
| colspan="4" style="text-align:left;" | Abstentions
| 
| 42.82%
| 
| 45.30%
|-
| colspan="8" style="background-color:#E9E9E9;"|
|- style="font-weight:bold"
| colspan="6" style="text-align:left;" | Result
| colspan="2" style="background-color:" | UMP WIN
|}

Sources

 Official results of French elections from 1998: 

5